Murcheson Creek is a 1976 Australian television film which was a feature-length pilot for an unmade TV series.

Premise
A young Sydney doctor returns to his home town in the outback and discovers his father is dead. He takes over his family practice.

Cast
Mark Edwards as Dr. Andrew Murcheson
Sandra Lee as Dr. Myfanwy McKenna
Abigail as Donna Lewis
Rowena Wallace as Karen Fields

References

External links

Australian drama television films
1976 television films
1976 films
Films directed by Terry Bourke